This list of pathological conditions reported in Mesozoic dinosaurs enumerates the various types of injury, disease, deformity or parasite infection identified among Mesozoic dinosaur fossils.

The list

See also

 List of pathological dinosaur specimens
 Theropod paleopathology

Footnotes

References
Molnar, R. E., 2001,  Theropod paleopathology: a literature survey, In: Mesozoic  Vertebrate Life, edited by Tanke, D. H., and Carpenter, K., Indiana University  Press, p. 337-363.
Rothschild, B., Tanke, D. H., and Ford, T. L., 2001,  Theropod stress fractures  and tendon avulsions as a clue to activity, In: Mesozoic Vertebrate Life, edited by Tanke, D. H., and Carpenter, K., Indiana University Press, p. 331-336.

Dinosaur paleopathology
Dinosaur-related lists
Mesozoic dinosaurs